The 4th West Virginia Infantry Regiment was an infantry regiment that served in the Union Army during the American Civil War.

Service

The 4th West Virginia Infantry Regiment was mustered into Federal service on June 17, 1861, at Grafton, Point Pleasant, and Mason City, Virginia. It was recruited primarily in Ohio from the counties of Meigs, Gallia, Lawrence and Athens, which contributed seven full companies. Among its early recruits was future United States Congressman John L. Vance, who would rise to the rank of lieutenant colonel. The regiment fought in the Kanawha Valley Campaign of 1862 as part of a brigade commanded by Colonel Samuel A. Gilbert.

Toward the end of the war, the regiment's re-enlisting veterans were consolidated with the 1st West Virginia Infantry Regiment (3 Year) on December 21, 1864, to form the 2nd West Virginia Veteran Infantry Regiment.

Casualties
The 4th West Virginia Infantry Regiment suffered 3 officers and 80 enlisted men killed or fatally wounded in battle and 2 officers and 156 enlisted men dead from disease, a total of 241 fatalities.

Colonels
Colonel James H. Dayton

Notable members
 Sergeant John C. Buckley, Company G, —  Participating in a diversionary "forlorn hope" attack on Confederate defenses, 22 May 1863.
 Sergeant William Bumgarner, Company A, — Participating in the same "forlorn hope."
 Private Jasper N. North, Company D, — Participating in the same "forlorn hope."
 Private James Calvin Summers, Company H, — Participating in the same "forlorn hope."
Captain William R. Brown, Company E, — Appointed Colonel of the 13th West Virginia Infantry Regiment in 1862

See also
List of West Virginia Civil War Union units
West Virginia in the Civil War

Notes

References

The Civil War Archive

External links
 
 A Forlorn Hope
 Vicksburg Medal of Honor Recipients

Units and formations of the Union Army from West Virginia
1861 establishments in Virginia
Military units and formations established in 1861
Military units and formations disestablished in 1864